This is a List of active ships of the Korean People's Navy, the naval service of North Korea. Most of the list includes Ships of Korean Origin. Yet, it also contains types that are less frequently used, with their origins from past communist countries of the Soviet Union, and China. In late years, the production of lightly armored, but yet mobile and maneuverable small PT Torpedo Boats increased, as well as Patrol and Landing Craft used in case of National Emergency. Submarines, on the other were costly, hard to manufacture. The Corvettes of the Korean People’s Navy were all outclassed by the 2000s and new ones are still under way.

Submarines

Frigates & Corvettes

Note:  Satellite images from 2007 indicate that the empty hull of a Krivak-class frigate was purchased by North Korea around 2003. The ship was likely bought from a Russian scrap dealer, lacking any weapons or radar upon purchase. While it was assumed that North Korea purchased the hull for scrap metal, it remains in its original state for nearly five years, and has been transported from Wonsan to Nampo Harbor.

Torpedo boats & missile craft

Patrol boats

Utility/landing craft

Naval Aviation

Only 2 ships in the KPN have aviation capability with only the Nampo-class corvette the only active ship with facilities (so far only 1 Nampo vessel has visible landing pad). The rotary aircraft would likely be the Mil Mi-4 PL Mil Mi-14 PL (ASW) and are flown by Korean People's Army Air and Anti-Air Force.

See also 
List of North Korean merchant ships

References

External links
 Global Security